Too Much Money is a 1926 American silent romantic comedy film directed by John Francis Dillon and starring Lewis Stone and Anna Q. Nilsson.

Plot
As described in a film magazine review, after watching his wife Annabel host a pajama breakfast party, Robert Broadley decides to curb his wife's social activities and takes his friend Dana Stuart's advice. He deeds his property to Stuart and tells his wife that they are broke. They move to a small apartment and Robert goes to work as a clerk in a store. While the husband is working, Stuart persuades the wife to elope with him. However, she tips off Robert and he catches up with them, and a fight ensues on the yacht. Meanwhile, the wife abstracts securities from Stuarts bag and then throws the bag overboard, having substituted papers for the valuables. Stuart jumps into the water after the bag. Husband and wife begin a new honeymoon with their regained fortune.

Cast
Lewis Stone as Robert Broadley
Anna Q. Nilsson as Annabel Broadley
Robert Cain as Dana Stuart
Derek Glynne as Duke Masters
Edward Elkas as Rabinowitz
Ann Brody as Mrs. Rabinowitz

Preservation
With no prints of Too Much Money located in any film archives, it is a lost film.

References

External links

1926 films
American silent feature films
Lost American films
Films directed by John Francis Dillon
First National Pictures films
American films based on plays
American black-and-white films
1926 romantic comedy films
American romantic comedy films
1926 lost films
Lost romantic comedy films
Films with screenplays by Joseph F. Poland
1920s American films
Silent romantic comedy films
Silent American comedy films